Butri is a rural locality (a selo) in Akushinsky District, Republic of Dagestan, Russia. The population was 1,097 as of 2010. There are 14 streets.

Geography 
Butri is located 16 km southeast of Akusha (the district's administrative centre) by road, on the Dargolakotta River. Ginta is the nearest rural locality.

References 

Rural localities in Akushinsky District